Greifswalder FC is a German association football club from Greifswald, Mecklenburg-Vorpommern.

History 
The club can be traced back to Greifswalder SC, which was founded in 1911, forcibly dissolved in 1945 and re-founded in 1990. Greifswalder SC had to file for insolvency in 2002 and was dissolved in 2003 after the insolvency proceedings were concluded; subsequently, Greifswalder SV was founded in 2004. Greifswalder FC was formed on 1 July 2015 through the merger of Greifswalder SV with Pommern Greifswald, after talks had already been held about a merger of the two clubs before the 2014–15 season. Pommern Greifswald's team was withdrawn from the NOFV-Oberliga Nord and the entire club was dissolved. The members joined Greifswalder SV, which was renamed Greifswalder FC.

Despite being eligible to play in the Oberliga, the club decided to take over the place of Greifswalder SV in the Verbandsliga Mecklenburg-Vorpommern. After two runner-up finishes in a row, Greifswalder FC was promoted to the NOFV-Oberliga Nord in the 2017–18 season. In the 2018–19 season, Greifswalder FC finished third behind Berlin-based clubs SV Lichtenberg and Tennis Borussia Berlin.

Since the 2020–21 season of the Mecklenburg-Vorpommern Cup was abandoned, the Mecklenburg-Vorpommern State Football Association decided that the best-placed team in Mecklenburg-Vorpommern's league system would take part in the 2021–22 DFB-Pokal. Since Hansa Rostock had already qualified for the DFB-Pokal via the 2020–21 3. Liga, Greifswalder FC was awarded the spot. In the first round, the team was eliminated by Bundesliga team FC Augsburg after a 4–2 home loss.

Recent seasons 

1 The 2019–20 and 2020–21 seasons were abandoned due to the COVID-19 pandemic in Germany. Greifswalder FC was ranked based on 2.33 (2019–20) and 1.89 (2020–21) points per game.

Stadium 

Greifswalder FC plays its home matches at Volksstadion Greifswald with a capacity of 8,000 seats.

Current squad

Managers 
 Hagen Reeck (1 July 2015 – 30 June 2017)
 Roland Kroos (1 July 2017 – April 2021)
 Martin Schröder (April 2021 – October 2021)
 Roland Kroos (October 2021 – present)

Notable former players 
 Christian Person (2015–2018)
 Sven Hartwig (2016–2018)
 Sascha Schünemann (2020–2021)

External links 
 Official website of Greifswalder FC

References 

Football clubs in Germany
Football clubs in Mecklenburg-Western Pomerania
Association football clubs established in 2015
2015 establishments in Germany